Claude Lanthier (January 24, 1933 – April 12, 2015) was a Canadian politician.

An engineering professional, professor at University de Montreal's École d'Architecture, and well known wine connoisseur (also member of the Board for Québec's Liquor Board c. 1978-1982), Lanthier was elected to the House of Commons of Canada as the Progressive Conservative Member of Parliament for the Montreal riding of Lasalle in the 1984 federal election. He served variously as Parliamentary Secretary to the Minister of Finance, Parliamentary Secretary to the Minister of State for Science and Technology, and lastly Parliamentary Secretary to the Minister of Public Works.

He was defeated in the 1988 federal election in what was now LaSalle—Émard riding by Paul Martin. Following his defeat, Lanthier was appointed as one of Canada's representatives on the International Joint Commission; later appointed Canadian chairman.

Electoral record (partial)

References

1933 births
2015 deaths
French Quebecers
Members of the House of Commons of Canada from Quebec
Politicians from Montreal
Progressive Conservative Party of Canada MPs